BTP may refer to:

Politics
 Basuki Tjahaja Purnama, Indonesian politician
 Bharatiya Tribal Party, Gujarat, India
 Boston Tea Party (political party), active in the U.S. from 2006 to 2012

Other uses
 Bis-triazinyl pyridines, a class of bound ligand polymers 
 Bis-tris propane, a biochemical buffering agent
British Transport Police, police force responsible for railways in England, Scotland and Wales
 Butler County Airport, Pennsylvania, US, IATA code
 Buoni del Tesoro Poliannuali, Euro-denominated bonds issued by the Italian Treasury